The Bunsen–Kirchhoff Award is a prize for "outstanding achievements" in the field of analytical spectroscopy. The prize is named in honor of chemist Robert Bunsen and physicist Gustav Kirchhoff.

Prizewinners

1990 	Günter Snatzke, Germany
1991 	Hannes Aiginger, Austria; Peter Wobrauschek, Austria; Joachim Knoth, Germany; Heinrich Schwenke, Germany
1992 	Kurt Laqua, Germany; Arnulf Röseler, Germany
1993 	Boris L'vov, Russia
1994 	D. Bruce Chase, United States; W. J. Orville-Thomas, Great Britain
1995 	Paul W.J.M. Boumans, Netherlands
1998 	Annemie Bogaerts, Belgium
2000 	Dieter Fischer, Germany
2001 	John A. McLean, United States
2002 	Jürgen Popp, Germany
2003 	Sergei Boulyga, Germany
2004 	Ewa Bulska, Poland
2005 	Nicolas Bings, Germany
2006 	Volker Deckert, Germany
2007   Jörg Bettmer, Germany 
2008   Sebastian Schlücke, Germany 
2009   Joachim Koch, Switzerland 
2010   Janina Kneipp, Germany
2011   Daniel Pröfrock, Germany
2012   Christoph Haisch, Germany
2013   Maria Montes-Bayón, Spain
2014   Oliver Reich, Germany
2015   Martín Resano, Spain
2016   Torsten Frosch, Germany
2017   Jacob T. Shelley, United States
2018   , Hungary
2020   Natalia P. Ivleva
2022   Carlos Abad Andrade

See also

 List of chemistry awards

References

Chemistry awards
Awards established in 1990
Analytical chemistry
German awards
Gustav Kirchhoff